Arctonasua is an extinct genus of raccoon-like procyonid of the Miocene, endemic to North America.

Species
 A. eurybates Baskin, 1982 - Sioux County, Nebraska, estimated age: ~10.5 Ma.
 A. floridana Baskin, 1982 - Alachua County, Florida, estimated age: ~11.5 Ma.
 A. fricki Baskin, 1982 - Texas County, Oklahoma, estimated age: ~8.4 Ma.
 A. gracilis Baskin, 1982 - Brown County, Nebraska and San Jacinto County, Texas, estimated age: ~8.4 Ma.
 A minima Baskin, 1982 - Dawes County, Nebraska, estimated age: ~17.1 Ma.

References

Prehistoric mammals of North America
Prehistoric procyonids
Prehistoric carnivoran genera
Fossil taxa described in 1982
Miocene musteloids